Sociologists for Women in Society (SWS) is an international organization of social scientists—students, faculty, practitioners, and researchers—working together to improve the position of women within sociology and society in general.

History 

In 1969, several hundred women gathered at a "counter-convention" at Glide Memorial Church rather than attend the ASA meetings at the Hilton Hotel. Sharing feelings of insecurity and stories of initially mystifying experiences as graduate students and faculty, and encouraging each other with applause, they came to see that some of the stresses in being sociologists were not idiosyncratic, but part of the experience of being women. Later that year, some 20 founding women met to build an organization and network. Although SWS was created to redress the plight of women sociologists, SWS has become an organization that also focuses on improving the social position of women in society through feminist sociological research and writing.

SWS holds annual meetings and publishes the academic journal Gender & Society.

SWS Journal
 Gender & Society

References

External links
Sociologists for Women in Society
Gender & Society (home page for journal)

Sociological organizations
Academic organizations based in the United States
Feminist organizations in the United States
Organizations for women in science and technology
1969 establishments in California
1969 in San Francisco